Jirsar-e Chukam (also Romanized as Jīrsar-e Chūkām) is a village in Chukam Rural District, Khomam District, Rasht County, Gilan Province, Iran. At the 2006 census, its population was 1,392, in 380 families.

References 

Populated places in Rasht County